The chrB-a RNA motif and chrB-b RNA motif refer to a related, conserved RNA structure that was discovered by bioinformatics.
The structures of these motifs are similar, and some genomic locations are predicted to exhibit both motifs.  The chrB-b motif has an extra pseudoknot that is not consistently found in chrB-a examples.  It was proposed that the two motifs could be unified into one common structure, with additional information.

Both motifs are found in Alphaproteobacteria and likely function as cis-regulatory elements, in view of their positions upstream of protein-coding genes. Additionally, the Shine-Dalgarno sequence of the genes is a part of the conserved secondary structure of the chrB motifs.  Thus, a stabilization of this secondary structure is expected to reduce gene expression.

The genes apparently regulated by these RNAs share a relationship with each other in that they are involved in resistance to toxic levels of chromate:
 Many of these genes are classified as the gene chrB, which was found to improve the resistance of Ochrobactrum tritici to chromate.
 Genes classified as chrA are also common.
 Genes that encode the enzyme superoxide dismutase are also common, and this gene also has an established role in chromate resistance.
 Rarely regulated genes with and without a relationship to chromate were also discussed.

Additionally, a chrB gene regulated by a chrB-a RNA in Sinorhizobium meliloti strain 1021 is highly expressed in bacteria growing on plants.

References

Non-coding RNA